The Survivor is a 1981 Australian supernatural horror film directed by David Hemmings and starring Robert Powell, Jenny Agutter, and Joseph Cotten. The film follows an airline pilot who, after surviving a mysterious crash that killed all of his passengers, is contacted by a clairvoyant who claims to be in contact with the victims. It is based on the 1976 novel of the same name by James Herbert. The film marked Cotten's final feature film appearance.

Plot
In Adelaide, Australia, airline pilot David Keller survives the crash of his Boeing 747-200, unhurt despite all of its 300 passengers dying in the accident. With no memories of the accident, he starts to suffer strange supernatural visions, guiding him to suspect that something happened in the crash and that the accident was not an accident.

Back at home, Keller attempts to return to his normal life, but is troubled by photographers attempting to photograph him and sell the images to newspapers. One photographer, whom Keller assaults, returns home where his girlfriend begins to develop the photographs. The man witnesses a young girl in his yard, and follows her as she beckons to a nearby cemetery; he is perplexed as she seems to appear and disappear right before him. The apparition of the child—a victim of the plane crash—reveals herself to have burn scars on her face, terrifying the photographer. He attempts to flee, but is cornered by the apparition on a set of train tracks, where he is killed by a passing train.

A vigil is held at the crash site, where a Catholic priest gives a sermon for the victims' families and others. After the vigil, Keller is approached by Hobbs, a clairvoyant who witnessed the plane crash from the ground, and who claims to have been contacted by the spirits of the victims. Keller visits Hobbs at her home and rebuffs her, after which she attacks him and the two have a scuffle in which both seem to lose control of their bodies, experiencing the untethered emotions of the victims.

Later, Hobbs is impelled to visit the home of the photographer who was killed by the train. As Hobbs observes the house from outside, the photographer's girlfriend begins developing photographs in their dark room, only to find the photographs develop into disturbing portraits of the burned crash victims. The woman, attacked by supernatural forces, is chopped to death by a large paper cutter.

Hobbs brings Keller to visit with the Catholic priest before the two decide to return to the crash site. Hobbs brings Keller inside the plane wreckage, where she seats him in the intact cockpit. Keller begins to experience regressive memories of the events leading up to the crash, which entail a passenger finding a bomb on board the plane which subsequently detonated, causing the plane to lose control. Keller awakens from the vision and he and Hobbs flee the crash site. Tewson, one of Keller's peers investigating the crash, arrives shortly after and is stabbed to death by an unseen figure.

Utilizing Hobbs's psychic impressions, Keller drives around the city as she directs him. The two arrive at an airplane hangar where Keller finds Slater, one of his peers from the airline, armed with a shotgun. Slater admits to having planted the bomb on the aircraft, hoping to kill Keller so that he could wrangle further control of the airline. Slater shows no remorse for the crime, deeming the 300 passengers as "nobodies". Moments later, the screams of the victims fill the hangar, and a large airplane propelling suddenly bursts into flames, triggering an inferno that burns both Keller and Slater to death. Hobbs watches from outside the hangar in horror as Keller stumbles out of it, engulfed in flames.

The following day, as the wreckage crew hauls away portions of the crashed plane, they discover Keller's burnt corpse seated in the cockpit.

Cast

Production
$350,000 of the budget was invested by the South Australian Film Corporation, with a similar amount coming from English investors. The rest came from Greater Union, a TV sale and private investment.

Prior to filming David Hemmings and Antony I. Ginnane discussed whether to make the film gory or more cerebral in the vein of The Innocents (1961). They chose the latter, a decision Ginnane later said was a mistake.

Ginnane asked Brian Trenchard-Smith to cut a ten-minute promotional reel for the film to entice potential buyers at the Milan Film Market before it had been finished. Because Jenny Agutter was scheduled to begin work on the film after the cut-off date from which Trenchard-Smith could draw material from the film's dailies, he shot his own material with her exclusively for the reel. He later cut the trailer for the actual film when it was released.

Reception
James Herbert, who wrote the novel upon which the film was based, described the film as "terrible ... absolute rubbish."

Accolades

See also
 Cinema of Australia

References

External links
 
The Survivor at Oz Movies
 The Survivor at the National Film and Sound Archive
 The New York Times
 Australian Film Commission
 Cinemafantastique (French)

1981 films
1980s English-language films
1981 horror films
1980s horror thriller films
Australian ghost films
Australian horror films
Australian horror thriller films
Australian supernatural horror films
Films about aviators
Films about psychic powers
Films based on British novels
Films scored by Brian May (composer)
Films shot in Adelaide
Films directed by David Hemmings
1980s Australian films